Al-An'am (The Cattle) is the sixth chapter (sūrah) of the Quran,  with 165 verses (āyāt). Coming in order in the Quran after al-Baqarah, Al 'Imran, an-Nisa', and al-Ma'idah, this surah dwells on such themes as the clear signs of Allah's Dominion and Power, rejecting polytheism and unbelief, the establishment of Tawhid (pure monotheism), the Revelation, Messengership, and Resurrection. It is a "Meccan surah", and it is believed to have been revealed in its entirety during the final year of the Meccan period of Islam. This explains the timing and contextual background of the believed revelation (Asbāb al-nuzūl). The surah also reports the story of Ibrahim, who calls others to stop worshiping celestial bodies and turn towards Allah.

Groups of modern Islamic scholars from Imam Mohammad Ibn Saud Islamic University in Yemen and Mauritania has issued fatwa that taken the interpretation from Ibn Kathir regarding Quran 61st verse of Al-An'am  and a Hadith transmitted by Abu Hurairah and Ibn Abbas, that the Angel of death has assistants among angels who helped him in taking souls.

Placement and coherence with other surahs
The idea of textual relation between the verses of a chapter has been discussed under various titles such as nazm and munasabah in non-English literature and coherence, text relations, intertextuality, and unity in English literature. Hamiduddin Farahi, an Islamic scholar of the Indian subcontinent, is known for his work on the concept of nazm, or coherence, in the Quran. Fakhruddin al-Razi (died 1209 CE),  Zarkashi (died 1392) and several other classical as well as contemporary Quranic scholars have contributed to the studies. The entire Qur'an thus emerges as a well-connected and systematic book. Each division has a distinct theme. Topics within a division are more or less in the order of revelation. Within each division, each member of the pair complements the other in various ways. The seven divisions are as follows:

References

External links 
 Quran 6 Clear Quran translation

An'am
Islam articles needing attention